Sunflower Revolution is a 3-day event held every fall in Cincinnati, Ohio, that raises funds and awareness about Parkinson's disease. Established in 2006, the event is sponsored by the James J. and Joan A. Gardner Center for Parkinson's Disease and Movement Disorders at the University of Cincinnati Neuroscience Institute, a part of UC Health University of Cincinnati. The Sunflower Revolution provides funding for research grants.

A virtual event was held in 2020.

References

External links
 Official web site
 UC Neuroscience Institute

Health-related fundraisers
Festivals in Cincinnati
2006 establishments in Ohio
Recurring events established in 2006